John Petticoats is a 1919 American silent action film directed by Lambert Hillyer and written by C. Gardner Sullivan. The film stars William S. Hart, Walt Whitman, George Webb, Winifred Westover, Ethel Shannon, and Andrew Arbuckle. The film was released on November 2, 1919, by Paramount Pictures.

Plot
As described in a film magazine, John Haynes (Hart), a lumberman known as "Hardwood," receives a letter informing him that he has inherited a business establishment in New Orleans. Surprised, although pleasantly so, he goes to that city to look over his heritage and finds that the business consists of a shop merchandising ladies' ware. In charge of the shop is Rosalie Andre (Shannon), whom he lets continue with the management of the store, with Hardwood John boarding with Judge Clay Emerson Meredith (Whitman) and keeping his identity secret. Caroline (Westover), the Judge's granddaughter, soon attracts John's attention, and mutual love ripens. Rosalie comes to grief at the hands of one Wayne Page (Webb), the dissolute son of a rich family who is also a rival for the hand of Caroline, and John is required to use force to see that Wayne does the wronged young woman justice. John and Caroline then look forward to their own happiness.

Cast
William S. Hart as 'Hardwood' John Haynes
Walt Whitman as Judge Clay Emerson Meredith
George Webb as Wayne Page
Winifred Westover as Caroline Meredith
Ethel Shannon as Rosalie Andre
Andrew Arbuckle as Rameses

Preservation
A copy of John Petticoats is in the Library of Congress and the Museum of Modern Art film archive and the Gosfilmofond Archive.

References

External links 

 
 

1919 films
American action films
Paramount Pictures films
Films directed by Lambert Hillyer
American black-and-white films
American silent feature films
1910s action films
1910s English-language films
1910s American films
Silent action films